The 2022–23 season is the 57th in the history of 1. FC Union Berlin and their fourth consecutive season in the top flight. The club are participating in the Bundesliga, the DFB-Pokal, and the UEFA Europa League.

Players

Current squad

Out on loan

Transfers

In

Out

Pre-season and friendlies

Competitions

Overall record

Bundesliga

League table

Results summary

Results by round

Matches 
The league fixtures were announced on 17 June 2022.

DFB-Pokal

UEFA Europa League

Group stage 

The draw for the group stage was held on 26 August 2022.

Knockout phase

Knockout round play-offs 
The draw for the knockout round play-offs was held on 7 November 2022.

Round of 16 
The draw for the round of 16 was held on 24 February 2023.

Statistics

Appearances and goals

|-
! colspan=14 style=background:#dcdcdc; text-align:center| Goalkeepers

|-
! colspan=14 style=background:#dcdcdc; text-align:center| Defenders

|-
! colspan=14 style=background:#dcdcdc; text-align:center| Midfielders

|-
! colspan=14 style=background:#dcdcdc; text-align:center| Forwards

|-
! colspan=14 style=background:#dcdcdc; text-align:center| Players transferred out during the season

References

1. FC Union Berlin seasons
Union Berlin
Union Berlin